= A Death in Shonagachhi =

2021 novel by Rijula Das

- First edition
- Author: Rijula Das
- Language: English
- Genre: Fiction
- Publisher: Picador India
- Publication date: 28 July 2021
- Publication place: India
- Pages: 312

A Death in Shonagachhi is a fictional novel written by Rijula Das. It was published on 28 July 2021 by Picador India.

== Reception ==
The Times of India wrote in a review "Although the novel is not quite a murder mystery or a crime novel, it is much more than that."

The Hindu wrote in a review "Das employs a measured pace; there is a restraint to her prose through which the pain of most of the characters (pimp and cop included) peeps through."
